Shiloh: Grant's Trial in the West is a 1987 video game published by Strategic Simulations.

Gameplay
Shiloh: Grant's Trial in the West is a game in which the Battle of Shiloh is covered using turns that last for an hour-and-a-half.

Reception
Jay C. Selover reviewed the game for Computer Gaming World, and stated that "Shiloh locks up SSI's position as the producer of the finest operational level American Civil War system to date."

Reviews
Computer Gaming World - Oct, 1990
Computer Play

References

External links
Review in ANALOG Computing
Review in Current Notes
Review in Antic
Review in Pelit (Finnish)

1987 video games
American Civil War video games
Apple II games
Atari 8-bit family games
Commodore 64 games
Computer wargames
DOS games
Strategic Simulations games
Turn-based strategy video games
Video games developed in the United States
Video games set in Tennessee